Savvas Xiros (Greek: Σάββας Ξηρός; born November 30, 1962) is a Greek terrorist and member of Revolutionary Organization 17 (N17). He was arrested on June 29, 2002 at the Piraeus port after a bomb exploded in his hands. He was put on trial in 2003. He was convicted of life imprisonment for murders, robberies, explosions and participation in N17.

References 

1962 births
Living people
Greek prisoners sentenced to life imprisonment
Prisoners sentenced to life imprisonment by Greece
Greek people convicted of murder
Anti-revisionists
Greek communists
Terrorism in Greece
Far-left politics
People from Florina